The 1978 edition of the Women's Handball Tournament of the African Games was the 1st, organized by the African Handball Confederation and played under the auspices of the International Handball Federation, the handball sport governing body. The tournament was held in Algiers, Algeria, contested by 6 national teams and won by Algeria.

Draw

Preliminary round

Group A

Group B

Knockout stage
Fifth place

Championship bracket

Final ranking

Awards

References

External links
 Official website

Handball at the 1978 All-Africa Games
Women's handball in Algeria
1978 in women's handball
Handball at the African Games